Michelle Loos is a former association football player who represented New Zealand at international level.

Loos made her Football Ferns as a substitute in a 3–3 draw with Australia on 18 May 1980, and finished her international career with 17 caps to her credit.

References

Year of birth missing (living people)
Living people
New Zealand women's international footballers
New Zealand women's association footballers
Women's association footballers not categorized by position